Yellow-banded skipper may refer to the following butterflies of the family Hesperiidae:

Pyrgus sidae of the Iberian Peninsula
Potamanaxas flavofasciata of Ecuador, Peru and Bolivia
Pseudocroniades machaon of Brazil

Animal common name disambiguation pages